Cerastium arcticum, the Arctic mouse-ear chickweed or Arctic mouse-ear, is a flower distributed at parts of western and southern Greenland, Baffin Island, Labrador, Iceland, Scotland, Norway and Svalbard.

It is a perennial herb that grows in tufts, sometimes loosely, generally in damp places and on open gravel. Most of the plant is pubescent, the hairs appearing stiff. Leaves are elliptical. The flowers are white, rather large, beautiful when fully expanded, single or two together. Petals are deeply notched and considerably longer than sepals.

See also 
 Flora of Svalbard

References 

arcticum
Alpine flora
Flora of Eastern Canada
Flora of Eastern Europe
Flora of Northern Europe
Flora of Siberia
Flora of Subarctic America
Plants described in 1880